First Love Again is a 2017 South Korean television series starring Myung Se-bin, Kim Seung-soo, Wang Bit-na, and Park Jung-chul. The series airs on KBS2 on Monday to Friday from 7:50 p.m. to 8:30 p.m. (KST).

Plot 
Lee Hajin has love and talent for cooking and is dating Cha Doyun, who unbeknownst to her, is the son of Chairman of LK group. Cha Doyun proposes to her which she accepts gladly, still unaware about his rich background. Cha Doyun's father wants his legitimate eldest son, Cha Doyun to marry Baek Minhui, the sole daughter and heir to Myunghua Foundation so that he can get material benefits from her family. When both Lee and Cha families meet for the formal meeting before the wedding, the enmity between two families is revealed and nobody wants Lee Hajin and Cha Doyun to marry. The whole situation is further complicated by an unwanted pregnancy, with Baek Minhui scheming to pass on her baby as Cha Doyun's child as to keep the baby's life safe from the clutches of her mother, the Chairwoman Kim of Myunghua Foundation. Will Baek Minhui be able to separate Cha Doyun and Lee Hajin? Will Cha Doyun and Lee Hajin be able to forget their first love?

Cast

Main cast
 Myung Se-bin as Lee Ha-jin
 Kim Seung-soo as Cha Do-yoon
 Wang Bit-na as Baek Min-hui
 Park Jung-chul as Choi Jung-woo

People around Ha-jin
Lee Duk-hee as Hong Mi-ae
Seo Ha as Chun Se-yoon
Kang Nam-gil as Director Park

People around Do-yoon
Kim Bo-mi as Kim Mal-soon
Jung Han-yong as Cha Duk-bae
Jo Eun-sook as Yoon Hwa-ran
Yoon Chae-sung as Cha Tae-yoon
Uhm Chae-young as Cha Hye-rin

People around Min-hui
Seo Yi-sook as Kim Young-sook
Kim Young-ki as President Baek

Others
Jung Ae-yun as Mrs. Seo
Choi Seung-hoon as Ga On
Song Won-seok

Ratings 
The blue numbers represent the lowest ratings and the red numbers represent the highest ratings
NR denotes that the drama did not rank in the top 20 daily programs on that date

Awards and nominations

References

External links
 First Love Again official KBS website 
 

Korean Broadcasting System television dramas
2016 South Korean television series debuts
2017 South Korean television series endings
Korean-language television shows
South Korean romance television series
South Korean melodrama television series